Waverly is an unincorporated community in Eaton County in the U.S. state of Michigan. It is a census-designated place (CDP) for statistical purposes and has no legal status as a municipality. The population was 23,925 at the 2010 census, up from 16,194 at the 2000 census. Waverly is home to the Lansing Mall and Waverly Community Schools.

The community is within Delta Charter Township and adjacent to the city of Lansing and Lansing Charter Township. The Lansing ZIP code 48917 serves the area defined by the Waverly CDP.

Geography

Demographics

2010
As of the census of 2010, there were 23,925 people living in the CDP.

See here for more 2010 census data for the Waverly CDP.

2000
As of the census of 2000, there were 16,194 people, 6,866 households, and 4,304 families living in the CDP. The racial makeup of the CDP was 81.33% White, 10.70% Black or African American, 0.36% Native American, 3.37% Asian, 0.05% Pacific Islander, 1.56% from other races, and 2.64% from two or more races. Hispanic or Latino of any race were 4.56% of the population.

There were 6,866 households, out of which 29.3% had children under the age of 18 living with them, 49.4% were married couples living together, 10.4% had a female householder with no husband present, and 37.3% were non-families. 30.9% of all households were made up of individuals, and 10.7% had someone living alone who was 65 years of age or older. The average household size was 2.34 and the average family size was 2.96.

In the CDP, the population was spread out, with 23.6% under the age of 18, 10.1% from 18 to 24, 27.1% from 25 to 44, 26.1% from 45 to 64, and 13.1% who were 65 years of age or older. The median age was 38 years. For every 100 females, there were 89.5 males. For every 100 females age 18 and over, there were 85.4 males.

The median income for a household in the CDP was $51,148, and the median income for a family was $64,248. Males had a median income of $49,375 versus $32,064 for females. The per capita income for the CDP was $26,867. About 4.5% of families and 5.8% of the population were below the poverty line, including 6.7% of those under age 18 and 6.8% of those age 65 or over.

References

Unincorporated communities in Eaton County, Michigan
Census-designated places in Michigan
Lansing–East Lansing metropolitan area
Unincorporated communities in Michigan
Census-designated places in Eaton County, Michigan